The following is the filmography for American actress Annette Bening.

Filmography

Film

Television

Stage

References

External links
 

Actress filmographies
American filmographies